Faisal Zeb is a Pakistani politician who had been a member of the Provincial Assembly of Khyber Pakhtunkhwa from August 2018 till January 2023.

Political career

He was elected to the Provincial Assembly of Khyber Pakhtunkhwa as a candidate of Awami National Party from Constituency PK-24 (Shangla-II) in 2018 Pakistani general election.

References

Living people
Awami National Party MPAs (Khyber Pakhtunkhwa)
Year of birth missing (living people)